Dervla Kirwan (born 24 October 1971) is an Irish actress. She has received a number of accolades, including two IFTA Awards for her performances in the film Ondine (2009) and the RTÉ thriller Smother (2021–) respectively.

Kirwan began her career in the BBC series Goodnight Sweetheart (1993–1996) and Ballykissangel (1996–1998), the latter of which won her a National Television Award. This was followed by further BBC roles in Hearts and Bones (2000–2001), 55 Degrees North (2004–2005), True Dare Kiss (2007), Material Girl and The Silence (both 2010). She also guest starred in the Doctor Who Christmas special "The Next Doctor" (2008).

Early life
Kirwan was born in Churchtown, Dublin, Ireland. Her father, Peter Kirwan, was an insurance broker, and her mother, Maureen O'Driscoll, was a language teacher. She is the youngest of three daughters. She attended Loreto Beaufort in Rathfarnham, Dublin, a Catholic school for girls, until the age of 16, when she was asked to leave as her career as an actress started to progress. Kirwan completed secondary school at the now-defunct non-denominational Sandymount High School in Dublin.

During an episode of Who Do You Think You Are? that aired in 2010, Kirwin learned more about her ancestors. Her great-grandmother was Margaret Collins-O'Driscoll, sister of Irish nationalist leader Michael Collins. Her maternal grandfather, Finian O'Driscoll, was Collins's nephew, and served three years with the Irish Republican Army.

Her paternal grandfather, Henry Kahn, was a Polish Jewish immigrant who had married her grandmother, Teresa O'Shea, a Catholic, in Ireland. In 1902, anti-Semitic judge Frederick Falkiner sentenced Kahn to a year in prison for breaking a shop window. The trial was known as a "notorious miscarriage of justice" and likely inspired a passage in James Joyce's Ulysses.

Career

Television

Kirwan's first credited TV roles were in the TV series Troubles in 1988 and The Lilac Bus in 1990 alongside Stephanie Beacham based on Maeve Binchy's novel.

Her breakthrough television role was appearing in the 1991 BBC Scotland production of A Time To Dance, adapted by Melvyn Bragg from his own novel, playing Bernadette Kennedy.

Kirwan briefly appeared in Casualty, and in the first three seasons of Goodnight Sweetheart alongside Nicholas Lyndhurst.

For 23 episodes, from 1996–1998, she appeared in Ballykissangel in the role of Assumpta Fitzgerald, the landlady of the village's only pub, Fitzgerald's. She reprised this role for a Comic Relief special of The Vicar of Dibley, and for a Father Ted special.

In 1999, she appeared in another BBC production, a made for TV Christmas film called The Greatest Store in the World. She played the single mother of two girls who are made homeless a few days before Christmas. Kirwan co-starred with Brian Blessed and Peter Capaldi. In 2001, she starred as Emma Rose in a BBC series Hearts and Bones alongside Sarah Parish, Amanda Holden, Hugo Speer and Damian Lewis. The show ran for two seasons. She also starred in the Sky TV series The Bombmaker as a former IRA bomb maker.

She appeared in the BBC 1 crime drama series 55 Degrees North with Don Gilet, which aired in 2004. She returned for a second season in 2005. The series was shown in the US under the title The Night Detective.

In 2007, she appeared in the BBC drama True Dare Kiss.

Kirwan appeared as the villain Miss Mercy Hartigan in The Next Doctor, the 2008 Christmas special of Doctor Who, alongside David Tennant and David Morrissey.

In 2009, Kirwan was in the BBC drama Moving On, where she played Laura in the episode Dress To Impress. She also guest starred in Law & Order: UK, playing the role of Beatrice McArdle.

Kirwan appeared in the BBC drama series Material Girl, which aired in January 2010. She was also cast in the role of Bundle in Agatha Christie's Marple.

Kirwan also appeared in the four-part BBC drama The Silence in 2010. She played the role of Maggie, the warm-hearted aunt of a young deaf girl who witnessed a murder. The Silence aired in July 2010.

In 2011, Kirwan worked on Injustice a five-part psychological thriller on ITV written by Anthony Horowitz. She starred as Jane Travers, wife of main character, Will Travers played by James Purefoy.

In June 2012, Kirwan appeared on screen as Alex Demoys alongside Christopher Eccleston in the three part BBC1 drama miniseries Blackout.

In 2018, Kirwan guest starred in one episode of Sky’s Strike Back: Retribution. She played Rachel Sheridan who helped design Guantanamo and may have built the black site where a Jihadi leader was being held. In the same year, she also appeared in the ITV drama Strangers (originally titled White Dragon) where she played the deceased wife of the titular character Jonah Mulray, played by John Simm.

In 2019, she appeared as a guest star in long-running BBC series Silent Witness playing the role of pathologist Amanda Long. In 2020, she appeared on Netflix miniseries The Stranger as Corinne Price.

In 2020, Kirwan began work on the Irish thriller series Smother, for  RTÉ Television. Production began in early 2020 but was halted in mid-March, due to the introduction of COVID-19 restrictions in Ireland. It recommenced in August 2020 and finished in late October. The series, set and filmed in County Clare, Ireland, debuted  on RTÉ One and RTÉ Player in early March 2021. The series was broadcast in the UK on Alibi in autumn 2021.

Stage

At the age of sixteen Kirwan moved to London when she was cast in a play at the Bush Theatre. She won acclaim in 1988 for her performance as the factory girl Linda in A Handful of Stars, the Bush Theatre premiere of the first play in Billy Roche's Wexford Trilogy. In 1992, again at the Bush, she starred in a revival of the complete trilogy.

In 1991, she appeared in the play Water Music at the Cockpit Theatre, written by award-winning playwright Lyndon Morgans (singer-songwriter with the Welsh folk noir band Songdog). In 1992, she also starred in Hush by April De Angelis at the Royal Court Theatre, while January 1994 found her playing in Peter Hall's seasonal production of Georges Feydeau's farce An Absolute Turkey at the Globe Theatre.

In 2001, she appeared in a stage production of Dangerous Corner by JB Priestley in Leeds alongside Rupert Penry-Jones, to whom she is now married. Kirwan again appeared on stage with Penry-Jones in Les Liaisons Dangereuses at the Bristol Old Vic directed by Samuel West in 2003.

In 2005, she appeared on the Lyttelton stage at the National Theatre in the role of Alice in Brian Friel's Aristocrats. In 2006, she played Bertha in Exiles at the National Theatre.

In 2007, she appeared on stage in Harold Pinter's Betrayal at the Donmar Warehouse.

From April to May 2012, Kirwan appeared on stage at the Chichester Festival Theatre in a Jeremy Herrin production of Uncle Vanya. Kirwan played Sonya alongside an exceptional cast which included Roger Allam (as Vanya), Timothy West and Lara Pulver. The play received warm reviews and response to Kirwan's performance was generally positive.

In April 2013, Kirwan was cast as Valerie in Josie Rourke's revival of The Weir by Conor McPherson at the Donmar Warehouse. Kirwan appeared alongside Brian Cox, Ardal O'Hanlon, Risteard Cooper and Peter McDonald. Critics lauded the play and gave it four- and five-star ratings. The Weir later transferred to the West End, playing at Wyndham's Theatre from January 2014 to April 2014.

In late 2014, Kirwan made her second stint at the Chichester Festival Theatre as Frankie in Frankie and Johnny in the Clair de Lune, a play by Terrence McNally about the relationship between waitress, Frankie and short-order cook, Johnny played by Neil Stuke. It was warmly received by critics who gave mostly four-star reviews. It ran from November 2014 to December 2014 at the Minerva theatre.

She appeared on stage in the Chichester Festival Theatre production of King Lear in 2017, directed by Jonathan Munby, where she played Goneril to Ian McKellen's Lear.

Film

In 1998, she starred alongside Christopher Eccleston in the Michael Winterbottom film With or Without You as Belfast girl Rosie Boyd.

Kirwan starred in School for Seduction, a 2004 film which also starred Kelly Brook.

Kirwan appeared in the Irish film Ondine alongside Colin Farrell and Stephen Rea which was released in 2009. She played Maura, the alcoholic bitter ex-girlfriend of Farrell's character, Syracuse.

In 2007, Kirwan began filming the fantasy film Luna by Dave McKean, starring alongside Ben Daniels, Stephanie Leonidas and Michael Maloney. However, due to budget setbacks, filming did not resume until 2011 and was finally completed in 2013. It premiered at the Toronto International Film Festival in 2014. The film was positively received by critics and Kirwan's performance was highly praised. Luna was awarded the Best British Film at the 2014 Raindance Film Festival.

She also starred in an independent thriller, Entity as Ruth Peacock. The film premiered in 2013 at selected cinemas and DVD and won Best Horror film at the London Independent Film Festival 2013.

In 2016, she starred as the violent and cruel crime boss Ed in Branko Tomovic's directorial debut Red.
  
In 2017, Kirwan appeared in the film Interlude in Prague, taking on the role of Frau Lubtak alongside Adrian Edmondson and Morfydd Clark.

Other

In 1997, Kirwan sang with Dustin the Turkey on his cover of "Fairytale of New York" for his album Faith of Our Feathers. She provided the voiceovers for the "This is not just food" television advertising campaign for UK retailer Marks & Spencer and also a string of three UK public information films about good food hygiene for the Food Standards Agency.

Personal life
In 2007, Kirwan married actor Rupert Penry-Jones after a four-year engagement. They have two children, Florence and Peter. They met in 2001 while working on stage together in a West Yorkshire Playhouse, Leeds, production of JB Priestley's Dangerous Corner, when he played Robert Caplan to her Olwen Peel. Kirwan again appeared on stage with Penry-Jones in Les Liaisons Dangereuses in 2003. They also both appeared in the television show Casanova in 2005, although they did not share any scenes.

She was previously engaged to her Ballykissangel co-star Stephen Tompkinson in 1998.

Filmography

Film

Television

Awards and nominations

Notes

References

External links
 
 "Dervla Kirwan: whirling Dervla" (actor profile)

1971 births
Living people
Dervla
Irish film actresses
Irish people of Polish-Jewish descent
Irish television actresses
People from Churchtown, Dublin